Andrzej Maria Gołaś (born 30 September 1946) is a Polish politician. He is a former senator representing Civic Platform and a former mayor of Kraków (1998–2002).

References

Nauka Polska, Senat.gov.pl. 

1946 births
Living people
Members of the Senate of Poland 2005–2007
Mayors of Kraków